Rocky Horror is a character from The Rocky Horror Show. It may also refer to

 The Rocky Horror Show, a stage musical from 1973
 The Rocky Horror Picture Show, 1975 film adaptation of the stage musical
 Rocky Horror Show Live, a 2015 performance
The Rocky Horror Picture Show: Let's Do the Time Warp Again